The Reichsstatthalter (Imperial lieutenant) was a title used in the German Empire and later in Nazi Germany.

Statthalter des Reiches (1879–1918)

The office of Statthalter des Reiches (otherwise known as Reichsstatthalter) was instituted in 1879 by the German Empire for the areas of Alsace (Elsaß) and Lorraine (Lothringen) that France had ceded to Germany following the Franco-Prussian War. It was a form of governorship intended to exist while Alsace-Lorraine became a federal state of the Empire. It was abolished when Alsace-Lorraine was, in turn, ceded back to France after Germany lost World War I.

Nazi Germany

During the Third Reich, the Nazis re-created the office of Reichsstatthalter (Reich Governor or Reich Deputy) to gain direct control over all states (other than Prussia) after winning the general elections of 1933. Their independent state governments and parliaments were successively abolished, and the Reich government took over direct control in a process called Gleichschaltung ("coordination"). Prussia's government had already been taken over by the Reich a year earlier in the Preußenschlag under Chancellor Franz von Papen.

Two weeks after the passage of the Enabling Act of 1933, which effectively made Adolf Hitler the dictator of Germany, the Nazi government issued the "Second Law on the Coordination of the States with the Reich" (Zweites Gesetz zur Gleichschaltung der Länder mit dem Reich) on 7 April 1933. This law deployed one Reich Governor in each of Germany's 17 states. The Reich Governors were given the task of overseeing the fulfillment of Hitler's political guidelines in the states. Indeed, the law required them to carry out "the general policy of the Chancellor." In practice, they acted with complete authority over the state governments. The governors' main authorities lay in:

 appointing and dismissing the state minister-president
 dissolving the state parliament and calling new elections
 issuing and announcing state laws
 appointing and dismissing important state agents and judges
 granting amnesty

In Prussia, the largest of the German states, Hitler took direct control by appointing himself as Reichsstatthalter. However, he delegated his authority to Hermann Göring, who had been installed as Minister President of Prussia without an election. The Prussian provinces were administered by an Oberpräsident, usually the local Gauleiter.

Law on the Reconstruction of the Reich (1934)

The Law on the Reconstruction of the Reich (Gesetz über den Neuaufbau des Reichs) passed on 30 January 1934; it formally de-federalized the Reich for the first time in its history. However, Germany had effectively become a highly centralized state with the passage of the Enabling Act and the posting of the Reich Governors. The state parliaments were abolished, and their sovereign powers were transferred to the Reich government. The Reich Governors were made responsible to the Reich Minister of the Interior, Wilhelm Frick. For all intents and purposes, the states were reduced to provinces.

Reich Governors Law (1935)

The Reich Governors Law (Reichsstatthaltergesetz) of 30 January 1935 formally designated the Reich Governors as the representatives of the Reich government, tasked with watching over the execution of Hitler's political guidelines. They received the authority to "inform" the provincial authorities about these guidelines, as well as the measures necessary to fulfill them. In practice, the Führerprinzip meant that this "information" amounted to an order.

The Reichsstatthalter were now also empowered to take over all functions of state government, and also appointed the mayors of all towns and cities with populations fewer than 100,000. This had the effect of giving the Reich Interior Ministry near-complete control over local government. The Interior Minister directly appointed the mayors of all cities with populations greater than 100,000 (though Hitler reserved the right to appoint the mayors of Berlin and Hamburg himself if he deemed it necessary), and as mentioned above, the Reich Governors were responsible to him.

Anschluss

After Austria's Anschluss ("union") with Germany, its last pre-Anschluss Chancellor, Arthur Seyss-Inquart, became its first Reichsstatthalter and Führer der Österreichischen Landesregierung (Leader of the Austrian State Government) from 15 March 1938 to 30 April 1939. Also, Josef Bürckel was appointed Reichskommissar für die Wiedervereiningung Österreichs mit dem Deutschen Reich (Reich Commissioner for Reunification of Austria with the German Reich) from 23 April 1938 to 31 March 1940. At that point, each constitutive Land (with some differences in borders, e.g., Burgenland was partitioned away) was placed under the administration of its own Reichsstatthalter.

See also 
 Statthalter

References

 Alsace-Lorraine at worldstatesmen.org.

Gubernatorial titles
Government of the German Empire
Government of Nazi Germany